Events in the year 1806 in Norway.

Incumbents
Monarch: Christian VII

Events

Arts and literature

Births
2 February – Bersvend Martinussen Røkkum, politician (d.1867)
2 March – Carl Andreas Fougstad, politician (d.1871)
7 August – Tellef Dahll Schweigaard, politician (d.1886)
15 November – Hans Severin Arentz, politician (d.1875)

Full date unknown
Hans J. C. Aall, politician (d.1894)
Peder Paulsen Anzjøn, politician
Peter Munch Brager, priest and politician
Daniel Otto Isaachsen, businessperson and politician (d.1891)
Jacob Tostrup, goldsmith and jeweller (d.1890)

Deaths

Full date unknown
Ole Rødder, violinist (b.1743).

See also

References